The 1948–49 Irish Cup was the 69th edition of Northern Ireland's premier football knock-out cup competition.

The defending champions were Linfield, after they defeated Coleraine 3–0 in the 1947–48 final. However, they went out in the first round after a 2–0 defeat to Glentoran.

Derry City went on to win the cup for the first time, defeating the Glens 3–1 in the final.

Results

First round

|}

Replay

|}

Quarter-finals

|}

Replay

|}

Second replay

|}

Third replay

|}

Semi-finals

|}

Replay

|}

Second replay

|}

Final

References

External links
The Rec.Sport.Soccer Statistics Foundation - Northern Ireland - Cup Finals

Irish Cup seasons
2
Northern Ireland